Created in 2008, SoccerCleats101 is one of the soccer footwear review sites on the internet. Reviews from the website are used as a voice on Soccer.com.

The site is owned and operated by former Major League Soccer player, Bryan Byrne.

References

Internet properties established in 2008
American review websites
Association football websites
American sport websites